Dasineura auritae is a gall midge which forms galls on the leaves of  sallows (Salix species) and their hybrids. It was first described by Ewald Heinrich Rübsaamen in 1916.

Appearance of the gall
The gall is a short downward, hairless, roll containing one yellowish red larva, or if several rolls run together, several larvae. There are two generations per year; the summer generation pupate in the gall and the winter generation on the ground. It is found on eared willow (S. aurita), goat willow (S. caprea), grey willow (S. cinerea) (as well as their hybrids) and Alpine grey willow (S. glaucosericea).

Distribution
The insect has been found in Austria, Belgium, Denmark, Germany, Great Britain, the Netherlands, Norway, Poland, Sweden and Switzerland.

References

External links
 Dorset Nature

Cecidomyiinae
Gall-inducing insects
Insects described in 1916
Nematoceran flies of Europe
Taxa named by Ewald Heinrich Rübsaamen
Willow galls